Season 1978–79 was the 95th football season in which Dumbarton competed at a Scottish national level, entering the Scottish Football League for the 73rd time, the Scottish Cup for the 84th time and the Scottish League Cup for the 32nd time.

Overview 
For the fourth year in a row, Dumbarton played league football in Division 1, and after the previous season's performances, confidence was high.  However, as it took 7 games to register the first league win early hopes were dashed and a disappointing 7th-place finish was achieved.

In the Scottish Cup, for a second year running it was Partick Thistle that were the fifth round opponents and as in the previous year Dumbarton were to lose out.

In the League Cup, in the straight knock-out format, Dumbarton were to draw Premier Division St Mirren in the first round, and were to fall to a two-goal defeat at Love Street after a home no-scoring draw.

Locally, in the Stirlingshire Cup, Dumbarton were once again defeated by local rivals Clydebank, this time in the final.

Finally, Laurie Williams was given a testimonial for his 10 years of service to the club, and he captained Dumbarton against a Scottish League Select - the result being a 1-1 draw with Williams himself scoring the equalising penalty for Dumbarton.

Results & fixtures

Scottish First Division

Scottish Cup

Scottish League Cup

Stirlingshire Cup

Pre-season/Other Matches

League table

Player statistics

Squad 

|}

International Caps
Murdo MacLeod was selected to play for the Scottish Under 21 team in a friendly match against USA on 17 September 1978 played at Pittodrie Park (won by Scotland 3-1 and in which he scored one of the goals) and in a qualifying match for the European Under 21 Championships against Norway on 24 October 1978 played at Easter Road Stadium (won by Scotland 5-1).

Transfers

Players in

Players out

Reserve team
Dumbarton competed in the Scottish Reserve League First Division (West).

In the Scottish Second XI Cup, Dumbarton lost to Morton in the first round, and in the Reserve League Cup, Dumbarton lost to Partick Thistle, on aggregate, in the first round.

Trivia
  The League match against Clyde on 13 September marked Murdo MacLeod's 100th appearance for Dumbarton in all national competitions - the 76th Dumbarton player to reach this milestone.
  The League match against Montrose on 30 September marked Donald McNeil's 100th appearance for Dumbarton in all national competitions - the 77th Dumbarton player to reach this milestone.
  The League match against Raith Rovers on 9 December marked Graeme Sinclair's 100th appearance for Dumbarton in all national competitions - the 78th Dumbarton player to reach this milestone.
  The fee of £100,000 received for Murdo MacLeod's transfer to Celtic at the end of October broke the record set by Ian Wallace's departure two seasons earlier.

See also
 1978–79 in Scottish football

References

External links
Willie Russell (Dumbarton Football Club Historical Archive)
Iain Anderson (Dumbarton Football Club Historical Archive)
Joe Rowan (Dumbarton Football Club Historical Archive)
Gerry Findlay (Dumbarton Football Club Historical Archive)
Dave Govan (Dumbarton Football Club Historical Archive)
Scottish Football Historical Archive

Dumbarton F.C. seasons
Scottish football clubs 1978–79 season